Sălcuța is a commune in Dolj County, Oltenia, Romania with a population of 2,488 people. It is composed of four villages: Mârza, Plopșor, Sălcuța and Tencănău.

Natives
Constantin S. Nicolăescu-Plopșor

References

Communes in Dolj County
Localities in Oltenia